Sissel Tolaas is a Norwegian artist and researcher known for her work with smell.

Sissel Tolaas was born in 1963 in Stavanger, Norway and is based in Berlin. Tolaas has a background in chemistry, mathematics, linguistics, languages and art; she studied at the universities of Oslo, Warsaw, Moscow, St. Petersburg and Oxford.

Research on smell 
Tolaas researches diverse aspects relating to scents. She first started researching its importance in 1990 through art and design along other fields. At that time, she developed a "smell archive" in over 7,000 airtight jars. In January 2004 Tolaas established the Smell Research Lab Berlin for smell and communication / language, supported by IFF International Flavours and Fragrances. Her research has won recognition through numerous national and international scholarships, honours, and prizes including the 2014 CEW, New York award for chemistry & innovation; 2009 Rouse Foundation Award from Harvard University GSD; an honorary mention at the 2010 ArsElectronica in Linz, Austria; and the 2010-2011-2012-2014 Synthetic Biology / Synthetic Aesthetics Award from Stanford and Edinburgh Universities including a residency at Harvard Medical School. Tolaas founded the Institute of Functional Smells in 2010 (i.e. health, education, well-being) and in 2016 became a founding member of Future of Education, a collaboration with the Nanyang Technical University Singapore and The Future Education Platform, Berlin.

Cooperation

She works with numerous companies and institutions; participates in colloquiums and conferences internationally. Her projects and research have been presented in institutions such as TED Global, US; Interactive Africa/Design Indaba, South Africa; What Design Can Do, Holland and Brazil; World Science Festival, New York; World Congress of Synthetic Biology, Stanford University; Documenta 13, Kassel Germany; MOMA New York; MOMA San Francisco; Fondation Cartier, Paris; Serpentine Gallery, London; Hamburger Bahnhof, Berlin; Tate Gallery, Liverpool; Venice Biennale; Kochi Biennale; Liverpool Biennale; Sao Paulo Biennale; National Art Museum of China Beijing; Cooper-Hewitt Museum, New York, Minsheng Art Museum, Shanghai; Art Institute of Chicago; Architecture Biennale 2015, Shanghai; Time Museum Guangzhou, Edinburgh International Fashion Festival 2012, Louisiana Museum, Denmark.

She has had engagements with many universities around the world. These include MIT; Harvard University; Liverpool University; Oslo University; Moscow State University; Stanford University; TU, Berlin; Toronto University; Lund University; Edinburgh University; Bangkok University; Hong Kong University; University of Michigan; Pasadena Art Centre; Cape Town University; Koc University Istanbul; Brown University; RCA, London; Aalto University, Helsinki; Hong Kong Polytechnic University; Montreal University; Princeton University; Yale University; Humboldt University, Berlin; Tsinghua University, Beijing; Columbia University, New York; Parsons The New School For Design, New York; Aalto University, Helsinki; Vienna University; Oxford University; Montreal University; Princeton University; Yale University; Strelka Institute, Moscow; Polytechnic University, Moscow; London School of Economics; Design Academy Eindhoven, Netherlands.

The institutes with which Tolaas has worked include Fraunhofer Science Institute, Germany; Grenoble INP, France; Weizmann Institute of Science, Israel; Copernicus Science Gallery, Warsaw; Charité Humboldt University Hospital, Berlin; Max Planck Institute, Berlin; San Francisco Neurosciences Institute; Hexagram Science Centre, Quebec;  Institute for the Future, Palo Alto USA; Sandberg Institute, Amsterdam, Chronus Art Center, Shanghai;

Clients in government agencies and business have included Science NASA; ESA; IEEE Aerospace Research; BBC London; Sony Computer Science Lab, Paris; IFF Inc. New York; Statoil New Energy Program, Norway;  Louis Vuitton, Paris; E. Lauder Paris/NY; KPMG (law) Berlin; BMG SONY, Germany; ShowStudio/Nick Knight; Mercedes Benz Future Lab, Berlin; ADIDAS; New York; Johnson & Johnson, New York; Bangalore High Tech Park; Deutsche Bank, Germany;   Beijing Olympics; NESTA, London.

Projects

Tolaas has completed 52 City SmellScape research projects since 1998, of, for and with major cities all over the world such as Paris, Stockholm, Kansas City, Kansas, & Kansas City, Missouri, Berlin, Oslo, London, Cape Town, Kochi, Istanbul, Shanghai, Singapore, Tokyo, Amman, New York Central Park and Seoul.

Since 2018 Tolaas is working on an archive of the world's oceans and a project on the morbidity and decay of Detroit. Since 2014 Tolaas has been active in several start-ups in the field of the senses. In 2016 Tolaas launched the world's first Smell Memory Kit; several other devices and sense tools are in the pipeline.

The Re_Search Lab continues to support interdisciplinary projects and research involving smell, odor, and fragrance. It establishes communication among experts in different fields dealing with olfaction.

Her project Sweat Fear | Fear Sweat from 2005 examines the body odors of twenty men, all of whom have a severe phobia of other bodies. Their smells were collected and chemically reproduced. The simulated sweat molecules were painted onto the gallery walls using a micro-encapsulation process, where they became activated by touch.

In her artist's statement about the installation the Fear of smell — the smell of Fear at the 2005 Tirana Biennale, Tolaas explains: "In the modern West, we tend to think of smell in purely aesthetic terms, pleasant or unpleasant. In many other cultures however, smells have provided and still provide a basic means of defining the and interacting with the world. This is particularly the case in so far as odours are closely associated with personal and group identity. The study of the history, anthropology, and sociology of smells is, in a very real sense, an investigation into the ‘essence’ of human culture itself."

References

1963 births
Living people
Synthetic biology artists
Norwegian contemporary artists
People from Stavanger
20th-century Norwegian artists
20th-century Norwegian women artists
21st-century Norwegian artists
21st-century Norwegian women artists
Olfactory art